Sudutuy is a rural locality (an ulus) in Bichursky District, Republic of Buryatia, Russia. The population was 38 as of 2010. There is 1 street.

Geography 
Sudutuy is located 24 km northwest of Bichura (the district's administrative centre) by road. Petropavlovka is the nearest rural locality.

References 

Rural localities in Bichursky District